Chotów may refer to the following places:
Chotów, Greater Poland Voivodeship (west-central Poland)
Chotów, Łódź Voivodeship (central Poland)
Chotów, Świętokrzyskie Voivodeship (south-central Poland)